Macquarie University railway station is a metro station located on the Metro North West Line line, serving the Sydney suburb of Macquarie Park including the nearby Macquarie University and Macquarie Centre, as well as parts of the suburb of Marsfield. It was formerly part of the Sydney Trains T1 Northern Line, before being converted to metro use as part of the Sydney Metro network. It is the only train station in Australia which bears the name of a university.

History

Macquarie University station opened on 23 February 2009 on the same date as the Chatswood to Epping line.

Macquarie University station closed in September 2018 for seven months for conversion to a Sydney Metro station on the Sydney Metro Northwest line, which included the installation of platform screen doors.  It reopened on 26 May 2019.

Services

Macquarie University station is served by bus routes operated by Busways, Forest Coach Lines, Hillsbus, Transit Systems and Transdev.

Bus stops for Hillsbus routes and Transit Systems route 410 are located outside the station entrance. All other services stop at the nearby Macquarie Centre.

References

External links

Macquarie University station details Transport for New South Wales
Video of the Opening and Sustainable Initiatives

Easy Access railway stations in Sydney
Macquarie University
Sydney Metro stations
Railway stations in Australia opened in 2009
City of Ryde
Railway stations at university and college campuses